In baseball, hit by pitch (HBP) is a situation in which a batter or his clothing or equipment (other than his bat) is struck directly by a pitch from the pitcher; the batter is called a hit batsman (HB). A hit batsman is awarded first base, provided that (in the plate umpire's judgment) he made an honest effort to avoid the pitch, although failure to do so is rarely called by an umpire. Being hit by a pitch is often caused by a batter standing too close to, or "crowding", home plate.

Below is the list of the top 100 Major League Baseball players who have been hit by a pitch the most during their MLB careers. 

Hughie Jennings holds the Major League record for most hit by pitches, getting hit 287 times in his career. Craig Biggio (285), Tommy Tucker (272), Don Baylor (267), Jason Kendall (254), Ron Hunt (243), Dan McGann (230), Chase Utley (204), and Anthony Rizzo (201) are the only other players to be hit by 200 or more pitches during their careers.

Key

List

Stats updated as of the end of the 2022 season.

Notes

See also

Baseball statistics
List of Major League Baseball leaders in bases on balls

External links

Hit by pitch (HBP)
Major League Baseball statistics